Norin District is a district of Namangan Region in Uzbekistan. The capital lies at the city Haqqulobod. Its area is 207 km2. Its population is 166,100 (2021 est.).

The district consists of one city (Haqqulobod), 8 urban-type settlements (Qorateri, Margʻuzar, Norinkapa, Pastki choʻja, Uchtepa, Xoʻjaobod, Chambil, Shoʻra) and 8 rural communities.

References 

Districts of Uzbekistan
Namangan Region